Water tyrants are birds in the following genera:

Fluvicola
Ochthornis